Palomas Creek, also named Las Palomas Creek, and Palomas River, is a tributary stream of the Rio Grande in Sierra County, New Mexico. The South Fork Palomas Creek similarly has its source in the Black Range in the same National Forest at  just below the Continental Divide at an elevation of 8,960 / 2,959 meters.

References 

Rivers of Sierra County, New Mexico
Rivers of New Mexico